Henry Gildea (1890 – 9 April 1917) was a Scottish professional football inside right who played for Hibernian, Grimsby Town, Bristol City, Lochgelly United, East Fife and Dumbarton.

Personal life 
Gildea's brothers Peter and Willie were also footballers. Gildea served as a private with the Black Watch during the First World War and was killed in action in France on 9 April 1917. He was buried in Mindel Trench British Cemetery, Saint-Laurent-Blangy.

Career statistics

References

1890 births
Scottish footballers
Hibernian F.C. players
Grimsby Town F.C. players
Bristol City F.C. players
Lochgelly United F.C. players
East Fife F.C. players
Dumbarton F.C. players
1917 deaths
Date of birth missing
Scottish Football League players
English Football League players
British Army personnel of World War I
People from Broxburn, West Lothian
British military personnel killed in World War I
Black Watch soldiers
Association football inside forwards